The black mannikin or black munia (Lonchura stygia) is a species of estrildid finch found in New Guinea, from Mandum (Papua, formerly known as Irian Jaya, Indonesia) to Lake Daviumbu, Papua New Guinea. It is commonly found in flocks of maximum 20 birds, inhabiting savannas, wetlands, but sometimes they were also seen at rice crops.

Threats
This species is threatened by the destruction of reedbeds due to the introduction of rusa deer (Cervus timorensis). And they are also probably threatened by the encroachment of woodland on grasslands, due to increased numbers of livestock such as pigs. It is also adversely affected by the cage-bird trade.

References

BirdLife Species Factsheet

black mannikin
Birds of New Guinea
black mannikin